In Cold Blood is a 1983 double album by Johnny Thunders. The In Cold Blood album contains studio recordings and the Live LP contains live recordings.

Track listing In the Studio
All tracks composed by Johnny Thunders; except where indicated

Side A
"In Cold Blood"
"Just Another Girl"
Recorded at Downtown Studios, Boston, October 1982.

Side B
"Green Onions" (Steve Cropper, Booker T. Jones, Lewis Steinberg, Al Jackson, Jr.)
"Diary of a Lover"
"Look in My Eyes"
Recorded at Euphoria Sound Studios, Revere, March 1982.

Track listing The Live LP recorded at Jonathan Swift's, Cambridge 6th August 1982
All tracks composed by Johnny Thunders; except where indicated

Side A
"Intro"
"Just Another Girl"
"Too Much Junkie Business"
"Sad Vacation"
"Louie Louie" (Richard Berry)

Side B
"Gloria" (Van Morrison)
"Treat Me Like a Nigger"
"Do You Love Me" (Berry Gordy, Jr.)
"Green Onions" (Steve Cropper, Booker T. Jones, Lewis Steinberg, Al Jackson, Jr.)
"10 Commandments"

Personnel
Johnny Thunders - guitar, vocals
Walter Lure - guitar, vocals
Joe Mazzari - bass, guitar
Billy Rogers - drums
Simon Ritt - bass on "Louie Louie" and "Gloria" live versions
Keith Chagnon - drums on "Louie Louie" and "Gloria" live versions

Johnny Thunders albums
1983 albums
Albums produced by Jimmy Miller